Peter Joseph Ratican (April 13, 1887 – November 20, 1922) was an American soccer midfielder who competed in the 1904 Summer Olympics. He was born and died in St. Louis, Missouri.

Ratican, older brother to National Soccer Hall of Fame member Harry Ratican, grew up in St. Louis, Missouri where he attended Christian Brothers College.  In 1904, St. Louis hosted the 1904 Summer Olympics and CBC entered its men's soccer team into the games.  The CBC men took the silver medal, with Ratican playing all four matches as a midfielder.  Ratican later played professionally in the St. Louis Soccer League.  During the 1909–10 St. Louis Soccer League season, he was with St. Teresa F.C. At the time of his death following brain surgery, Ratican was both the owner of and a player on the Ben Millers.

References

External links
profile

1887 births
1922 deaths
American soccer players
Footballers at the 1904 Summer Olympics
Olympic silver medalists for the United States in soccer
St. Louis Soccer League players
St. Louis Ben Millers players
Soccer players from St. Louis
Medalists at the 1904 Summer Olympics
Association football midfielders
Christian Brothers Cadets men's soccer players